Akira Ishimaru (born March 16, 1928) is a Japanese-American electrical engineer and professor emeritus at Department of Electrical and Computer Engineering at University of Washington. He is best known for his contributions to the theory of wave scattering in random media.

Biography
Akira Ishimaru was born on March 16, 1928, in Fukuoka, Japan. He received his bachelor’s degree from University of Tokyo and Ph.D. degree in electrical engineering from University of Washington, respectively in 1951 and 1958. During his doctoral studies, he was supervised by Gedaliah Held. From 1951 to 1952, he worked at Electrotechnical Laboratory in Tanashi, Tokyo. In 1956, he was employed at Bell Labs. In 1958, he joined the faculty of the Department of Electrical Engineering of the University of Washington, where he was also an adjunct professor of applied mathematics. He became a professor emeritus at the institution in 1999. 

In 1996, Ishimaru was elected as a member of National Academy of Engineering "for his contributions to the theory and application of wave propagation and scattering in random media." Ishimaru is also the recipient of IEEE Centennial Medal (1984), IEEE Heinrich Hertz Medal (1999) and IEEE Third Millennium Medal (2000). He is a fellow of IEEE, the Optical Society of America, the Acoustical Society of America, and the Institute of Physics. He was the editor of Radio Science from 1979 to 1983, as well as the founding editor of the journals Waves in Random Media and Waves in Random and Complex Media.

Research
Ishimaru's research has mainly focused on wave propagation and scattering in random and turbulent media; his research has contributed to advances in microwave remote sensing, ultrasound imaging, laser surgery, radar systems and astronomy, as well as wireless and optical communications. His other research interests object detection and imaging in cluttered environments, inverse problems, wave propagation and scattering in the atmosphere and the terrain, acoustic scattering in the ocean and optical diffusion in tissues.

Ishimaru has also authored two textbooks on advanced electromagnetics: Wave Propagation and Scattering in Random Media (1978) and Electromagnetic Wave Propagation, Radiation, and Scattering (1991).

Selected publications
Books
Wave Propagation and Scattering in Random Media (1978) 
Electromagnetic Wave Propagation, Radiation, and Scattering (1991)

Journal articles

References

Members of the United States National Academy of Engineering
1928 births
People from Fukuoka
University of Tokyo alumni
University of Washington College of Engineering alumni
University of Washington faculty
Fellow Members of the IEEE
American electrical engineers
Electrical engineering academics
Japanese emigrants to the United States
American academics of Japanese descent
Fellows of Optica (society)
Fellows of the Acoustical Society of America
IEEE Centennial Medal laureates
Scientists at Bell Labs
Japanese electrical engineers
Optical engineers
Microwave engineers
American telecommunications engineers
Japanese telecommunications engineers
American acoustical engineers
Japanese acoustical engineers
Fellows of the Institute of Physics
20th-century American engineers
21st-century American engineers
20th-century Japanese engineers
21st-century Japanese engineers
American educators of Japanese descent
American textbook writers
Living people